Salem Township is one of the eighteen townships of Columbiana County, Ohio, United States. The 2010 census reported 5,484 people living in the township, 3,170 of whom were in the unincorporated portions of the township.

Geography
Located in the northern part of the county, it borders the following townships:
Green Township, Mahoning County - north
Beaver Township, Mahoning County - northeast corner
Fairfield Township - east
Elkrun Township - southeast corner
Center Township - south
Hanover Township - southwest corner
Butler Township - west
Perry Township - northwest

One city and two villages are located in Salem Township:
The eastern tip of the city of Salem, in the northwest
The village of Leetonia, in the northeast
The village of Washingtonville, in the north

Name and history

It is one of fourteen Salem Townships statewide.

The township was among the first organized in the county in 1803.

Government
The township is governed by a three-member board of trustees, who are elected in November of odd-numbered years to a four-year term beginning on the following January 1. Two are elected in the year after the presidential election and one is elected in the year before it. There is also an elected township fiscal officer, who serves a four-year term beginning on April 1 of the year after the election, which is held in November of the year before the presidential election. Vacancies in the fiscal officership or on the board of trustees are filled by the remaining trustees.

Township Trustees
William Heston, Chairman
John Wilms, Vice Chairman
Ray Heddleson

Fiscal Officer
Dale L. Davis

References

External links
County website

Townships in Columbiana County, Ohio
Townships in Ohio
1803 establishments in Ohio